Louisiana's 35th State Senate district is one of 39 districts in the Louisiana State Senate. It has been represented by Republican Jay Morris since 2020.

Geography
District 35 covers parts of Grant, Jackson, Lincoln, Ouachita, Rapides, and Winn Parishes in North Louisiana, including some or all of Monroe, West Monroe, Bawcomville, Brownsville, Claiborne, Ruston, Hodge, Ball, and Pineville.

The district is located entirely within Louisiana's 5th congressional district, and overlaps with the 11th, 12th, 13th, 14th, 15th, 17th, 22nd, and 27th districts of the Louisiana House of Representatives.

Recent election results
Louisiana uses a jungle primary system. If no candidate receives 50% in the first round of voting, when all candidates appear on the same ballot regardless of party, the top-two finishers advance to a runoff election.

2019

2015

2011

Federal and statewide results in District 35

References

Louisiana State Senate districts
Grant Parish, Louisiana
Jackson Parish, Louisiana
Lincoln Parish, Louisiana
Ouachita Parish, Louisiana
Rapides Parish, Louisiana
Winn Parish, Louisiana